Men's Super G World Cup 1987/1988

Final point standings

In Men's Super G World Cup 1987/88 all four results count. Pirmin Zurbriggen won the cup without a single race-win. All events were won by different skiers.

References
 fis-ski.com

World Cup
FIS Alpine Ski World Cup men's Super-G discipline titles